Polyhymno abaiella is a moth of the family Gelechiidae. It was described by Hans Georg Amsel in 1974 and is found in southern Iran.

References

Moths described in 1974
Polyhymno